Loxospora is a genus of lichen-forming fungi in the family Sarrameanaceae. It has 13 species. The genus was circumscribed by Italian lichenologist Abramo Bartolommeo Massalongo in 1852, with Loxospora elatina assigned as the type species. This crustose lichen was originally named Lecanora elatina by Erik Acharius in 1810.

Species
Loxospora assateaguensis  – Assateague Island, USA
Loxospora cismonica 
Loxospora confusa  – mid-Atlantic coastal plain of eastern North America
Loxospora cristinae  – Poland
Loxospora cyamidia 
Loxospora elatina 
Loxospora glaucomiza 
Loxospora isidiata 
Loxospora lecanoriformis  – New South Wales, Australia
Loxospora ochrophaea 
Loxospora septata 
Loxospora solenospora 

Loxospora pustulata  is now known as Lepra pustulata.

References

Lecanoromycetes
Lecanoromycetes genera
Lichen genera
Taxa described in 1852
Taxa named by Abramo Bartolommeo Massalongo